J. D.'s Revenge is a blaxploitation horror film released in 1976. It starred Glynn Turman and Lou Gossett. The main character becomes an unwilling host for the restless spirit of J.D. Walker, a hustler killed 30 years earlier when he was wrongfully accused of killing his sister.

Plot
The story centers around Isaac Hendrix (portrayed by Turman), a young college student studying law and a taxi-cab driver in New Orleans. While out on a night of fun with his friends and wife Christella, during a hypnosis act, he becomes an unwilling host for the restless spirit of J.D Walker, a hustler killed during the 1940s. Over the course of the film, "Ike" finds himself gradually being taken over by the sociopathic Walker, even eventually going so far as to adopt his hair and fashion style, mannerisms, and psychotic tendencies (including an attempted rape on his wife after she mocked his J.D. haircut). With the spirit of J.D. in complete control, he turns his attention toward wreaking vengeance against the man responsible for killing his sister, Theotis Bliss. Ike commits havoc all over town before making his way to the church where Theotis' brother works as a preacher, where he finally reveals himself and instructs Elijah to tell Theotis to meet him "on the killin' floor". Ike's wife has, meanwhile, gone to her ex-husband, a cop who is out for Ike's blood, believing him to be a simple psycho hiding behind a false persona—until he mentions to the Chief that Ike claimed his name was J.D. Walker, a man who was not only real, but also had died over 30 years ago. J.D. was a hustler who ran numbers during World War II, as well as a black-market meat plant where he was murdered by Theotis Bliss after witnessing the murder of his own sister, Betty Jo, at his hands because of her derisive chiding of him and threatening to expose the secret she held about her baby daughter. After being discovered over Betty Jo's lifeless body with her blood on his hand, Elijah Bliss (Gossett Jr.), Betty Jo's husband and the believed father of her child (and younger, submissive brother of Theotis), accused J.D of being the killer and J.D was gunned down on the spot by Theotis to cover up the event. Following Theotis to the old factory, Elijah finally learns the truth before getting into a struggle with Theotis for his gun, during which the weapon discharges and kills Theotis while Ike watches, and laughs maniacally as the event plays out. His business complete, J.D. appears to leave Ike's body and due to Elijah's testimony, he is allowed to go free to rejoin his wife and friends waiting for him outside.

Cast
 Glynn Turman as Isaac "Ike" Hendrix
 Louis Gossett Jr. as Reverend Elijah Bliss
 Joan Pringle as Christella Morgan
 Carl W. Crudup as Tony
 James Watkins as Carl
 Fred Pinkard as Theotis Bliss
 Jo Anne Meredith as Sara Divine
 Alice Jubert as Roberta Bliss / Betty Jo Walker
 David McKnight as J.D. Walker
 Stephanie Faulkner as Phyllis
 Fuddle Bagley as Enoch Land
 Earl Billings as Captain Turner
 Paul Galloway as Garage Man

Reception
The film received mixed reviews.

DVD
J.D.'s Revenge was released to DVD by MGM Home Video on April 1, 2003, as a Region 1 widescreen DVD.

J.D.'s Revenge was rated R18 in New Zealand for violence and horror.

References

External links

 J. D.'s Revenge at Rotten Tomatoes
 
 

1976 films
1976 horror films
African-American horror films
American International Pictures films
American supernatural horror films
Blaxploitation films
Films directed by Arthur Marks
Films scored by Robert Prince
Films shot in New Orleans
1970s English-language films
1970s American films